The Man Who Knew Love is a 1976 Spanish biographical film directed by Miguel Picazo which stars Timothy Dalton as John of God alongside Antonio Ferrandis, Jonathan Burn, Antonio Mendoza, Queta Claver and Ángela Molina.

Plot 
Set in 16th-century Granada (featuring everyday concerns such as the denouncement of Moriscos and Judaizantes and the limpieza de sangre, as well as the depiction of marginal environments), the plot tracks the life of Juan Ciudad (later known as Juan de Dios) and his struggle against the social, political and religious structures.

Cast

Production 
Una aventura iluminada. The film is a General Films Corporations production. Filming began in 1976. Shooting locations included Granada.

Release 
Distributed by Invercine Distribución, the film was theatrically released in Spain on 10 August 1978.

Reception 
The film was not well-received by critics.

References

External links

Spanish historical drama films
1970s Spanish-language films
Films directed by Miguel Picazo
Films set in the 16th century
Films shot in the province of Granada
Films set in Granada
Films based on Spanish novels
1970s Spanish films